The Good Buy Girls is an American reality television series on TLC that premiered on June 5, 2013. The show follows the lives of home shopping presenters Tara Gray and Brook Roberts and their plans of expanding DSN Jewelry.

Tara Gray

Tara Gray (née Tucker) is a TV host, writer and producer, as well as a former beauty queen who has competed in the Miss Teen USA and Miss USA pageants.  She has worked as a local journalist, reporter and entertainment presenter, as well as a national TV host and reporter. Gray and Brook Roberts star in the reality television series The Good Buy Girls on TLC.

Broadcast
Despite there being 12 episodes ordered the series was cancelled after four episodes and the remaining eight episodes were pulled from the schedule. Another six episodes were aired in May 2014.

The series premiered in Australia on August 19, 2015 on the Style Network.

Episodes

References

External links
 
 
 Tara Gray official website

2010s American reality television series
2013 American television series debuts
TLC (TV network) original programming
English-language television shows
2014 American television series endings